Heines is a German language surname. It is similar to Heine.

List of people with the surname 

 Edmund Heines (1897–1934), German Nazi politician
 Martin Heines (born 1962), American politician from Texas

See also 

 Haines (disambiguation)
 Heinz (surname)
 Heine
 Hines (name)
 Hynes

Surnames
Surnames of German origin
German-language surnames
Surnames from given names